The Norwegian Federation of Organisations of Disabled People (FFO) is an umbrella organization for interest organizations of disabled people in Norway.

It was founded on 21 September 1950. Originally named Landsnemnda av de delvis arbeidsføres organisasjoner, its current name dates from 1974.

References

External links
Official site

Organisations based in Oslo
Disability rights organizations
Organizations established in 1950
1950 establishments in Norway
Disability organisations based in Norway